Clifton Daniel, 3rd (or III; called Dan; (born July 4, 1947), Goldsboro, North Carolina) is a bishop in the Episcopal Church. He currently serves as the dean of the Cathedral of St. John the Divine.

Education
Daniel attended the University of North Carolina at Chapel Hill and graduated in 1969 with a Bachelor of Arts in Spanish education. He earned his Master of Divinity from Virginia Theological Seminary in Alexandria, Virginia. He received honorary Doctor of Divinity degrees from both Virginia Theological Seminary in 1997 and the University of the South in Sewanee, Tennessee in 1998.

Ordained ministry
Daniel was ordained to the diaconate in June 1972, and then to the priesthood in April 1973. In 1996 he was elected and consecrated bishop coadjutor of the Episcopal Diocese of East Carolina. With the death of B. Sidney Sanders, he became the diocesan bishop on June 5, 1997. He served the diocese until 2013, when he became provisional bishop of the Episcopal Diocese of Pennsylvania. After the consecration of Daniel Gutierrez in 2016, Daniel was first named interim dean–then on  20 June 2018 appointed 10th Dean–of the Cathedral of St. John the Divine in New York City.

Personal life
Daniel's marriage to Anne William Miller produced three daughters. His wife died in 2017.

References

Sources
Episcopal Diocese of East Carolina website

1947 births
Living people
American Episcopal deans
People from Goldsboro, North Carolina
University of North Carolina at Chapel Hill alumni
Virginia Theological Seminary alumni
Episcopal bishops of Pennsylvania
Episcopal bishops of East Carolina